Sonu Shivdasani  (born 1965) is an Indian-British hotelier, and the founder and CEO of Soneva (Guardian of the Culture), which owns luxury resorts, Fushi, Jani and Aqua in Maldives and Thailand. He is also the founder and former CEO of Six Senses Resorts & Spas, which had locations throughout South East Asia and Europe, and was sold in 2012.

Early life and education
Sonu was born in England, the youngest son of Lakshmi and Indoo Shivdasani (1918-1979), an Indian businessman who made his fortune trading in Nigeria, with his offices based in London and Geneva. His parents were originally from Sindh in British India (now Pakistan), though his father had immigrated to England long before the Partition of India. He studied at Eton College in England, followed by Le Rosey in Switzerland, later graduated from Oxford University with an MA in English Literature in 1988. 

His grandfather was an Indian Civil Services officer, while his father, who studied at Clare College, Cambridge built his business in finance, trade and agro-allied industries in West Africa, India and Europe. Later he founded the Inlaks Shivdasani Foundation in 1976, which funds education for students in India. His father died in 1979, when he was 13, leaving his older brother Azad to look after the family business. His elder sister, Bina Shivdasani, Countess Sella di Monteluce (1949–2006), worked in the field of women's education and was the first Asian High Sheriff of Greater London in 2002.

Career
After graduating from Oxford, Sonu started working with his older brother Azad Shivdasani managing the family businesses. After having worked together for two years he founded Six Senses BVI. In 1995, Sonu and his wife Eva, who took on the role of Creative Director, opened Soneva Fushi on the Island of Kunfunadhoo in the Maldives. Together they started the Evason group of hotels and the Six Senses Resorts & Spas, with properties opening across South East Asia and Europe. In 2009 they opened Soneva Kiri on the island of Koh Kood in Thailand. By 2011, Six Senses was an international luxury spa and resort chain with 26 resorts and 41 spas. Sonu sold Six Senses to Pegasus Capital in mid-2012, to focus on Soneva's resorts and Private Residences as part of the "One Owner, One Operator, One Philosophy, One Brand" strategy under Soneva.

Sonu is one of the founders of the Soneva Foundation (previously known as the SLOWLIFE Foundation), a UK-registered charity. In 2023, Sonu was honoured as an Officer of the Order of the British Empire (OBE) for services to tourism, sustainability and charity in the King’s New Year Honours 2023 Overseas and International List.

Personal life
He first met Eva Malmstrom, a Swedish model, through his sister, the late Countess Bina Sella di Monteluce, at the Grand Prix in Monte Carlo. They later married and spent their honeymoon traveling around some of the world’s most exclusive hotels and resorts, inspiring them to open their own. They leased a resort in the Maldives and set about creating their dream and a few years later opened Soneva Fushi. Eva became a designer and went on to become Soneva's Creative Director and Conscience, designing interiors at their resorts in the Maldives and Thailand.

References

External links
 Soneva website

1966 births
Living people
British hoteliers
Indian hoteliers
People educated at Eton College
Alumni of Institut Le Rosey
Alumni of the University of Oxford
British people of Indian descent
British people of Sindhi descent